Tatsiana Kapshai (born 9 November 1988) is a former professional Belarusian tennis player who has specialized in doubles.

On 18 September 2006, she reached her career-high singles ranking of world No. 665. On 20 March 2006, she peaked at No. 333 in the doubles rankings. She has won Three doubles titles on the ITF Women's Circuit.

Career
In September 2005, she won the Doubles title with her partner compatriot Ekaterina Dzehalevich at the $25k event in Tbilisi. She defeated Polish Karolina Kosińska and Belarusian Tatsiana Uvarova in the final.

Career finals

Doubles (3–2)

Ranking history

References

External links
 
 

1988 births
Living people
Belarusian female tennis players
21st-century Belarusian women